Orlovka (also given as Orlovke or Vernoye) was an interceptor aircraft base in Amur Oblast, Russia located 8 km north of Vernoye, in the Svobodny, Amur Oblast area. It is close to Ukrainka, a Long Range Aviation strategic bomber base. In the 1960s Orlovka was a deployment and dispersal airfield, then was upgraded in the early 1970s following an increase in military forces near the Chinese border after the Sino-Soviet split.  Orlovka is a hardened airfield with a large central tarmac area.

The base was closed in 2001 and is since abandoned.

Units stationed at Orlovka included:
 404 IAP (404th Interceptor Aviation Regiment) equipped with Mikoyan-Gurevich MiG-233P (NATO: Flogger) and then Sukhoi Su-27 (NATO: Flanker).  It was commissioned in 1974 and decommissioned in 2000.  The 404 IAP was dissolved into 23 IAP at Dzemgi.
 41 IAP (41st Interceptor Aviation Regiment) equipped with the Mikoyan MiG-29 (NATO: Fulcrum) starting in 1987.

References

Soviet Air Force bases
Soviet Frontal Aviation
Soviet Air Defence Force bases
Russian Air Force bases